In mathematics, particularly measure theory, a -ideal, or sigma ideal, of a sigma-algebra (read "sigma," means countable in this context) is a subset with certain desirable closure properties. It is a special type of ideal. Its most frequent application is in probability theory.

Let  be a measurable space (meaning  is a -algebra of subsets of ).

 ;
 When  and  then  implies ;
 If  then 

Briefly, a sigma-ideal must contain the empty set and contain subsets and countable unions of its elements. The concept of -ideal is dual to that of a countably complete (-) filter.

If a measure  is given on  the set of -negligible sets ( such that ) is a -ideal.

The notion can be generalized to preorders  with a bottom element  as follows:  is a -ideal of  just when

(i') 

(ii')  implies  and

(iii') given a sequence  there exists some  such that  for each 

Thus  contains the bottom element, is downward closed, and satisfies a countable analogue of the property of being upwards directed.

A -ideal of a set  is a -ideal of the power set of  That is, when no -algebra is specified, then one simply takes the full power set of the underlying set. For example, the meager subsets of a topological space are those in the -ideal generated by the collection of closed subsets with empty interior.

See also

References 

 Bauer, Heinz (2001): Measure and Integration Theory.  Walter de Gruyter GmbH & Co. KG, 10785 Berlin, Germany.

Measure theory
Families of sets